Toivo Harald "Kirves" Koljonen (12 December 1912 – 21 October 1943) was a Finnish axe murderer and the last Finn executed for a civilian crime. He was executed by firing squad for a sextuple murder.

Koljonen was born 1912 in Lahti, Finland. He had been sentenced to prison and incarcerated at Riihimäki Prison, from which he was moved to Huittinen auxiliary prison. He escaped from prison in 1943 and attempted to hide from the authorities.

On 17 March 1943, he found a nearby farmhouse where five family members lived – a mother, two grandparents, and two children. Two additional family members, the father and the eldest son, had been conscripted into the army and, consequently, were not present at the time. Koljonen first hid in the stable, where he killed the daughter of the family with an axe (kirves in Finnish, which became his nickname). He then broke into the living quarters and killed the other four family members, as well as a woman from the neighbourhood who had been visiting. Koljonen escaped, but was caught at Valkeakoski.

According to the martial law in force during the war, Koljonen was sentenced to death for the six murders. He was shot together with convicted Soviet infiltrators at Kärsämäki quarry in Maaria, near Turku on 21 October 1943.

Koljonen was the last Finn to be executed for a civilian crime in Finland. All subsequent executions were for military crimes. After Koljonen, a handful of Finns were sentenced to death for murder. Their sentences were commuted to life imprisonment in 1945. Capital punishment was abolished for civilian crimes in Finnish law in 1949.

Koljonen remains one of the worst axe murderers in Finnish history, along with Karl Malmelin.

See also 
 Juhani Aataminpoika

General references 
   Veli Junttilan kolumni Turun Sanomissa 19 May 2003
 Library of Congress cataloguing: http://lccn.loc.gov/00337053
 Pohjolan poliisi kertoo (Nordic police tells), Police yearbook, 1974

1912 births
1943 deaths
20th-century Finnish criminals
Finnish male criminals
People from Lahti
People from Häme Province (Grand Duchy of Finland)
People executed for murder
Finnish mass murderers
Mass murder in 1943
Massacres in Finland
Massacres in 1943
People executed by Finland by firing squad
Executed Finnish people
Finnish people convicted of murder
People convicted of murder by Finland
Executed mass murderers
Axe murder
Stabbing attacks in Finland
20th-century executions by Finland
Family murders